Michael Knox is an American music producer and artist manager.

Biography
The Macon, Georgia-born Knox, son of rock and roll singer Buddy Knox, is best known for discovering Jason Aldean and producing all of his albums.

He helped Crossin Dixon sign to Broken Bow Records, the same label to which Aldean is signed, after a friend of his saw the band perform. Other artists whom he has produced include Montgomery Gentry and Trace Adkins.

Before working as a producer, Knox was an executive at Warner/Chappell Music. His first production credit was Danni Leigh's "29 Nights". Knox worked as a song plugger. In 2011, Knox won Album of the Year from the Country Music Association for his production on My Kinda Party.

In 2012, he won two Academy of Country Music awards for Aldean and Kelly Clarkson's "Don't You Wanna Stay". He won the Academy of Country Music award for Vocal Event in 2013 for producing "The Only Way I Know", with Aldean, Luke Bryan, and Eric Church. He produced Canadian country artist Sykamore's debut album Pinto in 2022.

See also
Song recordings produced by Michael Knox

References

Year of birth missing (living people)
American country record producers
Living people
People from Macon, Georgia
Businesspeople from Georgia (U.S. state)